Deal with This is a compilation album by American rap group 2 Live Crew. It was released independently on January 20, 1993 via Macola Records and was entirely produced by Mr. Mixx (David P. Hobbs) and Fresh Kid Ice (Christopher Wong Won) under Rock On Crew and 2 Live Crew monikers. The tracks that appeared on this album were unreleased songs that Wong Won and Hobbs recorded before Brother Marquis (Mark D. Ross) and Luke Skyywalker (Luther Campbell) joined the group.

Track listing

Personnel 
 Christopher Wong Won - performer, producer
 David P. Hobbs - performer, producer
 Yuri Vielot - performer

References

External links 

1992 albums
2 Live Crew albums